The 1940 United States Senate election in Montana took place on November 5, 1940. Incumbent United States Senator Burton K. Wheeler, who was first elected to the Senate in 1922, and was re-elected in 1928 and 1934, ran for re-election. Though he faced a serious challenger in the Democratic primary, he emerged victorious, and advanced to the general election, where he faced E. K. Cheadle, a state district judge and the Republican nominee. Just like in 1934, Wheeler won re-election in a landslide, winning his fourth term in the Senate.

Democratic primary

Candidates
Burton K. Wheeler, incumbent United States Senator
H. J. Freebourn, Attorney General of Montana

Results

Republican primary

Candidates
E. K. Cheadle, Tenth Judicial Circuit District Judge
L. Ray Carroll, former State Senator
Floyd C. Fluent

Results

General election

Results

References

Montana
1940
1940 Montana elections